Syed Ghulam Bhik Nairang (26 September 1876 – 16 October 1952) was a distinguished lawyer, poet and Pakistan Movement leader. He was the Deputy Leader of the All-India Muslim League from 1938 to 1942, and was appointed to the Constituent Assembly of Pakistan in April, 1950.

Friendship with Allama Iqbal
He was close friends with Allama Muhammad Iqbal, a college hostel-mate and a fellow poet. Nairang had sketched Allama Iqbal's personality as a college student and had described the exact location of his college hostel room in an article that he wrote at that time. Allama Iqbal had resided in that hostel room between 1895 and 1900.

In 2016, the evidence mentioned about Iqbal's hostel room in Nairang's article helped the Government College's staff in tracing the exact location of his room.

Early life and career
Ghulam Bhik Nairang was born in Daurana, near Ambala in British India in 1876. He received his BA degree from Government College, Lahore. He also joined the editorial staff of a magazine, Makhzan. Nairang was politically active and became an important leader of Muslim India. He was a member of the Central Legislative Assembly from 1936 to 1942.

Nairang also was actively involved in the Khilafat Movement, played a protective and key role in resisting the anti-Muslim Shuddhi movement by some Hindu leaders in British Punjab where they were trying to reconvert Muslims back to Hinduism.

After migrating to Pakistan, he also was a member of the first Constituent Assembly of Pakistan.

Books
 Kalaam-e-Nairang - Nairang's compilation of poetry was published in 1982 from Karachi, Pakistan (first edition in 1907, second edition in 1917, third edition with detailed introduction by Moinuddin Aqeel in 1982)

References

External links
Nairang.org official website

1876 births
1952 deaths
Pakistani writers
Pakistani male poets
People from Ambala district
Poets from Haryana
Government College University, Lahore alumni
All India Muslim League members
Leaders of the Pakistan Movement
Members of the Central Legislative Assembly of India
Pakistani MNAs 1947–1954